The 2016 season was Loughborough Lightning's first season, in which they competed in the Women's Cricket Super League, a Twenty20 competition. The side finished third in the initial group stage, winning three of their five matches, therefore progressing to the semi-final. However, they lost to Western Storm by five wickets in the semi-final.

The side was partnered with Loughborough University, and played their home matches at the Haslegrave Ground. They were coached by Salliann Briggs and captained by Georgia Elwiss.

Squad
Loughborough Lightning's 15-player squad is listed below. Age given is at the start of Loughborough Lightning's first match of the season (30 July 2016).

Women's Cricket Super League

Season standings

 Advanced to the Final.
 Advanced to the Semi-final.

League stage

Semi-final

Statistics

Batting

Bowling

Fielding

Wicket-keeping

References

Loughborough Lightning (women's cricket) seasons
2016 in English women's cricket